1903 in Argentine football saw champion Alumni win its fourth consecutive league championship. On 26 July 1903 Alumni lost its first league game in four years. Flores A.C., which had left the Association in 1898, returned to the competition under the name "Club Atlético de Flores".

Primera División

The championship was expanded to a 6 team league format in 1903, with each team playing the other twice. In February 1903 the association changed its name from "The Argentine Association Football League" to "Argentine Football Association"

Final standings

Lower divisions

Primera B
Champion: Barracas A.C. II

Copa Bullrich
Champion: San Martín A.C.

Primera C
Champion: Estudiantes (BA) III

International cup

Tie Cup
Champion:  Alumni

Final

Argentina national team

Results

References

 
Seasons in Argentine football
Argentine